Djurgårdsbrunnskanalen (Swedish: "The Djurgården Well Canal") is a canal in central Stockholm, Sweden, separating the island Djurgården from the northern mainland (or more correctly Southern and Northern Djurgården).

Two bridges pass over the canal: Djurgårdsbrunnsbron and Lilla Sjötullsbron.

The decision to build the canal was made by King Charles XIV in 1825. The canal was completed in 1834. 
It was built to make it easier for smaller ships with supplies to reach the center of Stockholm, but also for aesthetic reasons because Djurgården is a royal park.

See also 
 Geography of Stockholm
 Isbladskärret

References

External links 
 kanaler.arnholm.nu - Images from Djurgårdsbrunnskanalen

Waterways in Sweden
Djurgården
Geography of Stockholm
Landforms of Stockholm County